The Sword of Forever is an original novel by Jim Mortimore  featuring the fictional archaeologist Bernice Summerfield. The New Adventures were a spin-off from the long-running British science fiction television series Doctor Who.

Synopsis
Bernice finds her own DNA in the stomach of a mummified dinosaur. Together with Patience, a sentient velociraptor, she travels ever backwards through time. She stumbles upon the 'Sword Of Forever', an object that could easily demolish entire worlds.

The story draws on conspiracy theories around the Knights Templar, the Ark of the Covenant and so forth. It also draws on earlier New Adventures' depictions of a future Earth.

1998 British novels
1998 science fiction novels
Virgin New Adventures
Novels by Jim Mortimore